Toivo Juhana Halonen (7 July 1893 – 29 October 1984) was a Finnish smallholder and politician. He was born in  Sääminki. He was imprisoned in 1918 for having sided with the Reds during the Finnish Civil War. He was a member of the Parliament of Finland from 1922 to 1945, representing the Social Democratic Party of Finland (SDP).

References

1893 births
1984 deaths
People from Savonlinna
People from Mikkeli Province (Grand Duchy of Finland)
Social Democratic Party of Finland politicians
Members of the Parliament of Finland (1922–24)
Members of the Parliament of Finland (1924–27)
Members of the Parliament of Finland (1927–29)
Members of the Parliament of Finland (1929–30)
Members of the Parliament of Finland (1930–33)
Members of the Parliament of Finland (1933–36)
Members of the Parliament of Finland (1936–39)
Members of the Parliament of Finland (1939–45)
People of the Finnish Civil War (Red side)
Prisoners and detainees of Finland
Finnish people of World War II